The Józef Zawadzki printing shop was a family-owned printing shop operating in Vilnius (Vilna, Wilno) from 1805 to 1939. It was established by Józef Zawadzki who took over the failing printing press of Vilnius University established in 1575. It was one of the largest and most prominent printing presses in Vilnius. Until 1828, it had the exclusive rights to publish university publications. It published numerous books and periodicals in Polish (e.g. the first collection of poetry by Adam Mickiewicz), Latin, Lithuanian (e.g. works by bishop Motiejus Valančius). It suffered difficulties due to Russification policies that closed Vilnius University in 1832 and banned Lithuanian press in 1864, but recovered after the restrictions were lifted due to the Russian Revolution of 1905. After World War I, it had difficulty competing with the larger printing presses in Poland. The press was sold to a Lithuanian company Spindulys in 1939 and nationalized by the Lithuanian Soviet Socialist Republic in 1940. After World War II, the press was transferred to the communist daily Tiesa.

History
Zawadzki, after studies of economy and book publishing in Wrocław (Breslau) and Leipzig, moved to Vilnius, then part of the Russian Empire, in 1803. He established a small printing press (his first work appears to be a student dissertation on galactorrhea published in June 1803). He bought inventory of the printing press of Vilnius University, which traced its roots to a press established by Mikołaj Krzysztof "the Orphan" Radziwiłł in 1575, on 1 November 1805 for 3,000 silver rubles payable in installments over ten years. Additionally, he rented the premises for ten years for another annual payment of 300 silver rubles. Zawadzki received financial assistance from Adam Kazimierz Czartoryski, who gifted him 1,000 ducats. The rental agreement was renewed until 1828 when Zawadzki lost the title of university printer and had to move out of the campus (at present-day Šv. Jono g. 4) to his own home (at present-day Bernardinų g. 8), where the press operated until 1940. 

When Zawadzki took over the press, he found 11 printing presses (seven of them outdated) and eight employees. He quickly purchased two new printing presses and typesets for Latin, Polish, Russian, Greek, German, Hebrew, and Arabic languages. The number of employees grew to 35 within a year. The press printed books, textbooks and academic literature for the university, periodicals, calendars, and (from 1808) sheet music. It also collaborated with the Jewish Romm publishing house. Zawadzki was a bibliophile and cared for the quality of the books, both in terms of accuracy of the texts (spelling, etc.) and graphic design. He hired the first full-time proofreader Jan Paweł Dworzecki-Bohdanowicz and worked with western printers to adapt new technologies. He imported high quality paper from Germany and France. To help sell the books, the press had its own bookstores in Vilnius, Warsaw, and Varniai (1853–1864). The bookstore in Vilnius was particularly large, numbering 20,000 titles in 1821. In 1853, the bookstore moved to new three-floor premises. It had sections of English, French, German, Italian, Lithuanian books and operated a library. Historian and librarian  estimated that the bookstore in Kražiai sold about 8,000 books from late 1859 to March 1863. After the death of Józef Zawadzki, the press was inherited by his son Adam (1814–1875) but was managed by his wife until 1851.

The failed Uprisings of 1831 and 1863 brought a wave of repressions and restrictions on books and periodicals. The university was closed in 1832 taking away textbook and academic publishing while Lithuanian press was banned in 1864. When Lithuanian books were banned, the press had 5,696 copies of four primers that were confiscated and burned. It also had 62,994 copies of 36 titles of pre-1864 Lithuanian books that it managed to get a permit to sell off. Many Lithuanian publishers in East Prussia used to counterfeit publication data, indicating that a book was published by the Zawadzki Press in 1863, in order to confuse the Russian police. The company improved its fortunes by the end of the 19th century and particularly after various restrictions were lifted due to the Russian Revolution of 1905. It was one of the first presses to acquire Lithuanian typesets in 1904. In 1909, it acquired the printing shop of Edmund Nowicki, which he had moved from Saint Petersburg in 1906. Expecting large orders from bishop Eduard von der Ropp, Nowicki employed 40–50 workers. It became a branch of the main Zawadzki Press.

The company diminished during World War I and found it difficult to compete with larger printers in the Second Polish Republic. It stopped printing Lithuanian texts in 1920. The press was purchased in 1939 by Kaunas-based publishing house . The company was nationalized in July 1940 by the newly established Lithuanian Soviet Socialist Republic. It was renamed to Švyturys (beacon) and transferred to the communist daily Tiesa in 1945. In 1989, during the rise of the independence movement, it restored its original name, Spindulys.

Publications

In the first three years, the press printed 27 books. In 1805–1838, under Józef Zawadzki, the press printed 851 books. Most of these books were in Latin and Polish, and only three in Lithuanian (including Lietuwiszkas ewangelias by Jonas Jaknavičius financed by bishop ). In 1854–1864, the press published 596 books – 348 works in Polish, 107 in Latin, 105 in Lithuanian, 25 in Russian, and 11 in French and German. Among the Polish works, there were works by Adam Mickiewicz (including his first poetry book in 1822), Józef Ignacy Kraszewski, Henryk Sienkiewicz, Julian Ursyn Niemcewicz, Jan Śniadecki, Joachim Lelewel. Among the Lithuanian books, there were works by bishop Motiejus Valančius, Laurynas Ivinskis, Simonas Daukantas, Konstantinas Sirvydas. In 1852–1862, the press published approximately 65% of all Lithuanian books. During the Lithuanian press ban, the press managed to get three Lithuanian publications approved by Russian censors: 26,000 copies of two Catholic prayer books in 1879 and a petition by Donatas Malinauskas to allow Lithuanian-language services at the Church of St. Nicholas in Vilnius. In total, the press published about 700 Lithuanian books.

Periodicals printed by the Zawadski Press included:
  (1806)
  (1805–1825)
 Wizerunki i Roztrząsania Naukowe (1834–1843)
  (1849–1851)
 Lietuvos ūkininkas, Kurier Litewski, Jutrzenka, Zorza Wileńska (1900–1910s)

References

Printing companies
Retail companies established in 1805
Retail companies disestablished in 1939
History of Vilnius
Defunct companies of Poland
Companies based in Vilnius
1805 establishments in the Russian Empire
1939 disestablishments in Lithuania